Kri na dlaneh is a novel by Slovenian author Robert Titan Felix. It was first published in 2004.

See also
List of Slovenian novels

Slovenian novels
2004 novels